The red-crested cotinga (Ampelion rubrocristatus) is a species of bird in the family Cotingidae.

It is found in Bolivia, Colombia, Ecuador, Peru, and Venezuela. Its natural habitats are subtropical or tropical moist montane forests and heavily degraded former forest.

References

red-crested cotinga
red-crested cotinga
Taxonomy articles created by Polbot
Taxa named by Alcide d'Orbigny
Taxa named by Frédéric de Lafresnaye